The Memory Spot chip is an integrated circuit currently in development by Hewlett-Packard. The chip incorporates a central processing unit, random access memory and a wireless receiver, all bundled together in a device 1.4 or 2 mm².

The research to design and build the chip was done in Hewlett-Packard's laboratory in Bristol.

Hewlett-Packard says that the chip is so small that it can be built into almost any object, and have proposed several possible uses. These include, but are not limited to:

Ensuring that drugs have not been counterfeited
Tagging patients' wristbands in hospitals
Authenticating prescription-pill bottles
Adding multimedia to postcards
Incorporation into books
Storing image files on printed pictures to print an identical copy

HP claim that once the units are in mass-production, they may cost as little as one dollar each.

No batteries are needed because the chips get their power by induction from the devices which read the data.

Current wireless transfer speeds are 10 Mbit/s.

According to magazine Popular Science, the devices "can store and transfer up to four megabytes of data" and should be available on store shelves within two years (Mone 2006).

Awards 
 2006 - Popular Science Best of What's New - General Innovation

References 

BBC Online: Tiny wireless memory chip debuts
New Scientist: Tiny radio chip can stores video clips
Hewlett-Packard's press release
Mone, G. (2006). "When Photos Talk". Popular Science 269 (4): 51.

See also 
 Radio Frequency Identification

Memory spot chip
HP storage devices